The Battle of Sialkot was fought between the Durrani Empire led by Jahan Khan and the Sukerchakia Misl of Dal Khalsa (Sikh Army) led by Charat Singh on November 12 1763.

The battle
Ahmad Shah Durrani returned to Kabul after his invasion to India and he appointed Kabuli Mal and Zain Khan Sirhindi as the Governors of Lahore and Sirhind respectively. The Afghan Governor of Lahore was facing harassment by Sikh bands and with the passage of time, the Governor came under increasing Sikh pressure and the Sikhs had by this time by force of their chivalry and also cavalry defeated some Afghan army garrisons which were stationed in several villages in the Punjab region. However, these defeats were not taken lightly by Ahmad Shah Durrani, who was angered at the Sikhs. Therefore, he sent one of his most trusted generals, Jahan Khan to eliminate the growing threat of the Sikhs. Jahan Khan and his forces met with the Sikhs in the city of Sialkot, northeast of Lahore. In the ensuing battle, Jahan Khan and his forces were met with much more ferocity by the Sikhs just like they had 2 years before in this same city. The Sikh attacks forced the Afghans to withdraw. The battle ended in a Sikh victory.

References

 Hari Ram Gupta, History of the Sikhs: Sikh Domination of the Mughal Empire, 1764–1803, second ed., Munshiram Manoharlal (2000) 
 Hari Ram Gupta, History of the Sikhs: The Sikh Commonwealth or Rise and Fall of the Misls, rev. ed., Munshiram Manoharlal (2001)  

1760s in the Durrani Empire
History of Sikhism
Sialkot 1763
History of Sialkot